Joseph Mbatia Bertiers (born 1963) is a Kenyan painter and sculptor. He is best known for his imaginative depictions of political history and life-size scrap metal sculptures.

In 2006, Bertiers was selected to participate in Dak’Art and won first prize at a national competition for contemporary art organized by Alliance Française and the Goethe-Institut in Nairobi. His artwork has been exhibited across Africa, Europe, and North America.

References 

Living people
Kenyan painters
African sculptors
1963 births